The Suwa Seriya Foundation (Suwa Seriya Ambulance Service or 1990 Ambulance Service)  is a nonprofit organization responsible for operating ambulances and answering and responding to urgent and emergency medical situations within all nine provinces of Sri Lanka. The service responds to 1990 phone calls across the island. 

In 2016, the foundation was established on a  $7.56 million grant from the Government of India on a request made by the Government of Sri Lanka on a proposal made by Harsha de Silva, then a deputy minister for a pre-hospital emergency ambulance service, which Sri Lanka lacked at the time. The initial grant allowed the ambulance service start its service in the Western and Southern Provinces with a fleet of 88 ambulances. In the next few years, the service was expanded to all nine provinces of the island with a fleet of 297 ambulances. The ambulances were purchased from Tata Motors with an additional grant from India worth $15.09 million. Initially the service was opposed by nationalist groups and the Government Medical Officers Association.

See also
 Emergency medical services in Sri Lanka
 Fire services in Sri Lanka
 Emergency medical services
 Health care in Sri Lanka

References

External links 
 Official website 

Organizations established in 2016
Ambulance services in Sri Lanka